

Specific heat capacity

Notes 
 All values refer to 25 °C and to the thermodynamically stable standard state at that temperature unless noted.
 Values from CRC refer to "100 kPa (1 bar or 0.987 standard atmospheres)". Lange indirectly defines the values to be at a standard state pressure of "1 atm (101325 Pa)", although citing the same NBS and JANAF sources among others. It is assumed this inexactly refers to "ambient pressure".

References

CRC
As quoted in an online version of:
 David R. Lide (ed), CRC Handbook of Chemistry and Physics, 84th Edition. CRC Press. Boca Raton, Florida, 2003; Section 4, Properties of the Elements and Inorganic Compounds; Heat Capacity of the Elements at 25 °C

WEL
As quoted at http://www.webelements.com/ from these sources:
 R.H. Schumm, D.D. Wagman, S. Bailey, W.H. Evans, and V.B. Parker in National Bureau of Standards (USA) Technical Notes 270–1 to 270–8, 1973.
 J.D. Cox, DD., Wagman, and V.A. Medvedev, CODATA Key Values for Thermodynamics, Hemisphere Publishing Corp., New York, USA, 1989.

LNG
As quoted from various sources in:
 J.A. Dean (ed), Lange's Handbook of Chemistry (15th Edition), McGraw-Hill, 1999; Section 6, Thermodynamic Properties; Table 6.3, Enthalpies and Gibbs Energies of Formation, Entropies, and Heat Capacities of the Elements and Inorganic Compounds

See also 

Thermodynamic properties
Chemical element data pages